Mike Jenkins (November 3, 1982 – November 28, 2013) was an American professional strongman competitor from Westminster, Maryland. Jenkins worked as a high school athletics director at Milton Hershey School in Hershey Pa, when not competing as a strongman. He was a college and professional football player before switching over to strongman competition in 2007. He won the Maryland's Strongest Man contest in 2007 which qualified him for the North American amateur national strongman championships later that year and he placed sixth in that contest. He placed second in the North American nationals in 2009.

Jenkins competed in the inaugural Arnold Amateur Strongman World Championships in 2010 and won that contest. This victory earned him his pro strongman card, as well as an invite to the 2011 Arnold Strongman Classic. He competed in the 2010 America's Strongest Man later in the year and placed second behind 3-time champion Derek Poundstone.

He entered the 2011 Arnold Strongman Classic placing second overall ahead of the reigning World's Strongest Man, Zydrunas Savickas. and qualified for the finals of the 2011 World's Strongest Man contest, which, though winning the first 2 events, he had to withdraw from after suffering a back injury, finishing in eighth place overall.

Jenkins won the 2012 Arnold Strongman Classic, finishing ahead of former champions Derek Poundstone, Zydrunas Savickas and Brian Shaw, and won the Giants Live event in Melbourne, Victoria, Australia on March 17, 2012, which qualified him for the 2012 World's Strongest Man contest later in the year.

Mike Jenkins died on November 28, 2013, aged 31, in Dauphin County, Pennsylvania from an enlarged heart caused by long-term steroid use.

References

1982 births
2013 deaths
People from Westminster, Maryland
American strength athletes